Pinar de Chamartín is a station on the Madrid Metro, opened to the public on 4 November, 2007.  It is located in fare Zone A and serves the area of Pinar de Chamartín.

The station is the terminus for Line 1, Line 4 and the Metro Ligero line 1. As Line 1 is one of the most important lines in Madrid, Line 4 serves the local area of Hortaleza, and the ML1 serves the nearby Cercanías station in the new and expanding neighborhood of Sanchinarro, the station sees a high amount of traffic for being in a relatively low-population neighborhood far removed from the city center.

There's a tramway exhibited in the station, as a tribute to the old Madrid tramway (the new tramway system is the Metro Ligero). This tramway appears in the movie Doctor Zhivago and the neighborhood appears in the Spanish-language movie La cabina.

References 

Line 1 (Madrid Metro) stations
Line 4 (Madrid Metro) stations
Railway stations in Spain opened in 2007
Madrid Metro Ligero stations
Buildings and structures in Ciudad Lineal District, Madrid